Paul Arthur "Lefty" Gehrman (May 3, 1912 – October 23, 1986) was an American professional baseball player. He was a right-handed pitcher for one season (1937) with the Cincinnati Reds. For his career, he compiled an 0–1 record, with a 2.89 earned run average, and 1 strikeout in 9 innings pitched. His only decision occurred on September 15, in a 5–8 loss to the Brooklyn Dodgers at Crosley Field.

Gehrman was born in Marquam, Oregon, and died in Bend, Oregon, at the age of 74.

References

External links

1912 births
1986 deaths
People from Clackamas County, Oregon
Cincinnati Reds players
Major League Baseball pitchers
Baseball players from Oregon
Durham Bulls players
Albany Senators players
Syracuse Chiefs players
Birmingham Barons players
Los Angeles Angels (minor league) players
Sportspeople from Bend, Oregon